Malice (German: Der Mann aus dem Jenseits) is a 1926 German silent film directed by Manfred Noa and starring Paul Wegener, Olga Tschechowa and Anton Pointner.

The film's art direction was by Artur Günther.

Cast 
 Paul Wegener as Hauptmann Römer  
 Olga Tschechowa as Seine Frau  
 Anton Pointner as Leutnant Teutenberg  
 Bruno Ziener as Lawyer
 Zehra Achmed
 Hans Albers 
 Frigga Braut 
 Jaro Fürth

References

Bibliography
 Jennifer M. Kapczynski & Michael D. Richardson. A New History of German Cinema.

External links

1926 films
Films of the Weimar Republic
Films directed by Manfred Noa
German silent feature films
German black-and-white films